The Gamacists were a political faction within the Liberal Party led by Germán Gamazo, which split from the party in early 1899 after the signing of the Treaty of Paris ending the Spanish–American War of 1898. Among its members were future prime minister and Conservative leader Antonio Maura, son-in-law of Gamazo, as well as other notorious liberal MPs.

After Gamazo's death in 1901, it eventually merged into the Liberal Conservative Party of Francisco Silvela in 1902.

References

Bibliography

Liberal Party (Spain, 1880)
Defunct political parties in Spain
Political parties established in 1899
Political parties disestablished in 1902
1899 establishments in Spain
1902 disestablishments in Spain
Restoration (Spain)